Maurice Joyce (born March 13, 1969) is an Irish director, animator, and storyboard artist. Joyce was born in Dublin, Ireland, and was formerly based in New York City. He has worked on television series and films including Teenage Mutant Ninja Turtles, Felidae and Beavis and Butt-Head Do America.

In 1999, he made his feature-length directoral debut with Doug's 1st Movie, a film adaptation of the Nicktoon Doug.

References

External links
 

1969 births
Living people
Irish animated film directors
Irish television directors
Cartoon Saloon people
Film people from Dublin (city)